Peter Robert Law (born 1943) is a British actor and educator. He is the father of artist Natasha Law and actor Jude Law.

Law was born Peter Robert Tagg, the son of Emily Florence Ethel Tagg, a domestic servant, and Eric Phillip Law, an accountant.

References

1943 births
Living people
British educators
British male actors
Place of birth missing (living people)
Date of birth missing (living people)